Commercial Bank Chad , also spelled as Commercial Bank Tchad (CBT), is a commercial bank in the Republic of Chad. It is a member of the Commercial Bank Group and is affiliated with the Commercial Bank of Cameroon (CBC), Commercial Bank Centrafrique (CBCA), the Commercial Bank Equatorial Guinea (CBGE) and Commercial Bank São Tomé and Príncipe (CBSTP).

Ownership
The shareholding in Commercial Bank Tchad is as depicted in the table below:

See also
 Commercial Bank Group
 Commercial Bank of Cameroon
 Central Bank of Central African States

References

External links
 Website of Commercial Bank Tchad

Companies of Chad
Banks of Chad
Banks established in 1998
Economy of Chad
N'Djamena